Hodei Mazquiaran (born 16 December 1988, Alsasua, Spain) is a Spanish track cyclist.  At the 2012 Summer Olympics, he competed in the Men's sprint.

References

Spanish male cyclists
Living people
Olympic cyclists of Spain
Cyclists at the 2012 Summer Olympics
Spanish track cyclists

1988 births
Cyclists from Navarre